The Odžaklija church (Chimney church also known as the Old church, Стара црква) is an early 19th-century Serbian Orthodox church located in Leskovac, Serbia.

It was built during the First Serbian Uprising of the Serbian revolution. The Ottoman Empire forbade the locals to build a church, so the people announced the building of a home to the town priest, adding a nonfunctioning chimney to fool the Turkish lords.

References

External links
Grad Leskovac: Spomenici kulture - Stara leskovačka crkva Odžaklija

Churches completed in 1812
19th-century Serbian Orthodox church buildings
Serbian Orthodox church buildings in Serbia
Leskovac
First Serbian Uprising